Jargaltulgyn Erdenebat is a Mongolian politician and a member of the Mongolian People's Party. He was the 29th Prime Minister of Mongolia from 7 July 2016 to 4 October 2017.

Biography
Erdenebat was born on 17 July 1974 in Mandal sum, Selenge Province. He graduated from the University of Commerce and Business (later merged with the National University of Mongolia) in 1995.

In 2008, Erdenebat was appointed Governor of Selenge Province, a position he held until 2012. He won a seat during the 2012 parliamentary election, and served as Minister of Finance from 2014 to 2015 as part of the coalition government. He became Prime Minister in 2016, after the Mongolian People's Party swept the 2016 parliamentary election.

References

1974 births
Living people
Mongolian People's Party politicians
National University of Mongolia alumni
People from Selenge Province
Prime Ministers of Mongolia
Finance ministers of Mongolia
21st-century Mongolian politicians